Working Environment (Air Pollution, Noise and Vibration) Convention, 1977 is  an International Labour Organization Convention.

It was established in 1977, with the preamble stating:
Having decided upon the adoption of certain proposals with regard to working environment: atmospheric pollution, noise and vibration,...

Ratifications
As of 2022, the convention had been ratified by 47 states.

External links 
Text.
Ratifications.

International Labour Organization conventions
Occupational safety and health treaties
Environmental treaties
Treaties concluded in 1977
Treaties entered into force in 1979
1977 in labor relations
1979 in the environment
Air pollution
Noise pollution
Treaties of Azerbaijan
Treaties of Belgium
Treaties of Bosnia and Herzegovina
Treaties of the military dictatorship in Brazil
Treaties of Costa Rica
Treaties of Croatia
Treaties of Cuba
Treaties of Czechoslovakia
Treaties of the Czech Republic
Treaties of Denmark
Treaties of Ecuador
Treaties of Egypt
Treaties of Finland
Treaties of France
Treaties of Germany
Treaties of Guatemala
Treaties of Ghana
Treaties of Guinea
Treaties of Hungary
Treaties of Ba'athist Iraq
Treaties of Italy
Treaties of Kazakhstan
Treaties of Kyrgyzstan
Treaties of Latvia
Treaties of Lebanon
Treaties of Luxembourg
Treaties of Malta
Treaties of Montenegro
Treaties of Niger
Treaties of Norway
Treaties of Poland
Treaties of Portugal
Treaties of the Soviet Union
Treaties of San Marino
Treaties of Yugoslavia
Treaties of Serbia and Montenegro
Treaties of Seychelles
Treaties of Slovakia
Treaties of Slovenia
Treaties of Spain
Treaties of Sweden
Treaties of Tajikistan
Treaties of Tanzania
Treaties of North Macedonia
Treaties of the United Kingdom
Treaties of Uruguay
Treaties of Zambia
Treaties extended to Anguilla
Treaties extended to Montserrat
Treaties extended to the Isle of Man
Treaties extended to Jersey
Treaties extended to Guernsey